Debacq & Cie is a French luxury jeweller and watchmaker. It was founded in 1812 by Raymond Sabe in the Saint-Nicolas-des-champs district of Paris.

History 

Debacq & Cie was established in Paris in 1812 by Raymond Sabe, who manufactured and traded gold jewellery on 358 rue de la Port St Denis. In 1838, he handed the business to his nephews Félix, Victor and Pierre Eugène. Together with Sinice Debacq (the husband of Sabe’s niece) they started a new company "Debacq et Sabe", also known as "Debacq et Sabe neveu" with a store at Royale St Martin 29.

In February 1863, M. Francois-Philippe-Sinice Debacq and M. Pierre Sabe established "Debacq et Sabe jeune" on rue Réaumur, 31.

Debacq participated in the 1873 Vienna World's Fair.

Henri Vever, author of La bijouterie francaise au XIXe siecle (1800-1900) (1908) briefly mentions the firm among other "renowned jewelers" of the French Third Republic. In the beginning of the XX century, "Debacq, Peyret & Cie" was well-known for working with diamonds.

Production 
Before the World War I Debacq produced a number of pieces in Art Nouveau style alongside more traditional diamond set jewels. The firm used plique-à-jour enamel technique to create items such as a dragonfly brooch with translucent, lacy wings that fluttered when worn.

Bibliography

References 

Jewellery companies of France
French business families
Watch manufacturing companies of France
Manufacturing companies based in Paris
Retail companies established in 1812
French brands